Annick Level (born 5 December 1942) is a French foil fencer. She competed at the 1964 and 1968 Summer Olympics.

References

External links
 

1942 births
Living people
Sportspeople from Tarbes
French female foil fencers
Olympic fencers of France
Fencers at the 1964 Summer Olympics
Fencers at the 1968 Summer Olympics
Universiade medalists in fencing
Universiade silver medalists for France
Medalists at the 1963 Summer Universiade
Medalists at the 1967 Summer Universiade